Sonja Zinkl is an Austrian mountain bike orienteer. At the 2009 World MTB Orienteering Championships in Ben Shemen, she won a silver medal in the long distance, and a gold medal in the relay, together with Elisabeth Hohenwarter and Michaela Gigon.

References

Austrian orienteers
Female orienteers
Austrian female cyclists
Mountain bike orienteers
Living people
Place of birth missing (living people)
Year of birth missing (living people)
21st-century Austrian women